Aakash Aath is an Indian Bengali-language television channel based in Kolkata, established in 2000 by G Entertainment as Akash Bangla. In October 2013, a new logo was unveiled and the channel was rebranded to Akash Aath. The current CEO is Ashok Surana and the director is Ishita Surana. The channel broadcasts news at 5.00 pm, evening and 10.30 pm.

Currently broadcasts
Bhakti Geeti
Good Morning Akash Live
Radhuni
Aakaash Barta Live
Jheel Danger Kanya
Meyder Brata Katha
Yuganayak Swami Vivekananda
Sahitya Shera Samay
Tomaay Hrid Majhare Rakhbo
Police Files
Shreyoshi

Formerly broadcasts
Kanchi
Mahalaya
Anandamoyee Maa
Jannani
Ak Maser Sahitya
Choye Maser Mega
Ghente Gha
Lakkhi Chana
Aakashe Superstar
Gaan Fight
Hridmajhaye 1,2,3
The Legend 1,2,3
Gaan points
Crime Bengal
Section 302
Padyaradi Para Bawali Gaan 
Nati Binodini
Umar's family
Bridhashram 1, 2
Om Sai Ram
Eka Noy Ekkaborti
Gandaria 1,2,3

References

External links

Bengali-language television channels in India
Television channels and stations established in 2000
Television stations in Kolkata
2000 establishments in West Bengal